FBU may refer to:

 Burundian franc
 French Blue (airline)
 Fire Brigades Union in the UK 
 Five Branches University, in California, United States
 Oslo Airport, Fornebu, now defunct
 Swedish Federation for Voluntary Defence Education and Training
 Ukrainian Basketball Federation